Sir Thomas Tyrwhitt Jones, 1st Baronet (1 September 1765 – 26 November 1811) of Stanley Hall, Shropshire, was a British politician.

He was the eldest son of Captain John Tyrwhitt, RN, of Netherclay House, Bishop's Hull, Somerset and educated at Winchester and Christ Church, Oxford. He succeeded his cousin Sir Thomas Jones in 1782, adopting the additional surname of Jones in 1790.

He was the Member of Parliament for Weymouth and Melcombe Regis from 1790 to June 1791. Jones subsequently represented several other constituencies.  He was MP for Denbigh Boroughs from January 1797 to 1802; Athlone from 22 August 1803 to 1806; and Shrewsbury from 1807 to 26 November 1811. He was created a baronet on 3 October 1808.

He was elected a Fellow of the Royal Society in 1800.

He died at his residence, Clarence Lodge near Roehampton, now in south-west London. He had married Harriet Rebecca, the daughter of Edward Williams of Eaton Mascott, Shropshire, with whom he had three sons and two daughters, one of whom married John Mytton in 1818. He was succeeded by Sir Thomas John Tyrwhitt Jones, 2nd Baronet, MP for Bridgnorth and  High Sheriff of Shropshire for 1816–1817.

References

External links
 

1765 births
1811 deaths
People from Somerset
Alumni of Christ Church, Oxford
Baronets in the Baronetage of the United Kingdom
British MPs 1790–1796
British MPs 1796–1800
Members of the Parliament of Great Britain for English constituencies
Members of the Parliament of Great Britain for Welsh constituencies
Members of the Parliament of the United Kingdom for English constituencies
Members of the Parliament of the United Kingdom for Athlone
Members of the Parliament of the United Kingdom for Welsh constituencies
UK MPs 1801–1802
UK MPs 1802–1806
UK MPs 1807–1812
Fellows of the Royal Society